Gymnastics is a type of sport that includes physical exercises requiring balance, strength, flexibility, agility, coordination, and endurance. The movements involved in gymnastics contribute to the development of the arms, legs, shoulders, back, chest, and abdominal muscle groups. Gymnastics evolved from exercises used by the ancient Greeks that included skills for mounting and dismounting a horse, and from circus performance skills.

The most common form of competitive gymnastics is artistic gymnastics (AG), which consists of, for women (WAG), the events floor, vault, uneven bars, and beam; and for men (MAG), the events floor, vault, rings, pommel horse, parallel bars, and horizontal bar.

The governing body for competition in gymnastics throughout the world is the Fédération Internationale de Gymnastique (FIG). Eight sports are governed by the FIG, including gymnastics for all, men's and women's artistic gymnastics, rhythmic gymnastics, trampolining (including double mini-trampoline), tumbling, acrobatic, aerobic, and parkour.  Disciplines not currently recognized by FIG include wheel gymnastics, aesthetic group gymnastics, TeamGym, and Mallakhamba.

Participants in gymnastics-related sports include young children, recreational-level athletes, and competitive athletes at all levels of skill.

Etymology
The word gymnastics derives from the common Greek adjective γυμνός, by way of the related verb γυμνάζω (gymnazo), whose meaning is to "train naked", "train in gymnastic exercise", generally "to train, to exercise". The verb had this meaning because athletes in ancient times exercised and competed without clothing.

History

Gymnastics can be traced to exercise in ancient Greece – in Sparta and Athens. That exercise for that time was documented by Philostratus' work Gymnastics. Exercise in the gymnasium in later periods prepared men for war. The original term for the practice of gymnastics is from the related Greek verb γυμνάζω (gumnázō), which translates as "to train naked or nude" because young men exercising trained without clothing. In ancient Greece, physical fitness was a highly valued attribute in both men and women. It wasn't until after the Romans conquered Greece in 146BC that gymnastics became more formalized and used to train men in warfare. Based on Philostratus' claim that gymnastics is a form of wisdom, comparable to philosophy, poetry, music, geometry, and astronomy, Athens combined this more physical training with the education of the mind. At the Palestra, a physical education training center, the discipline of educating the body and educating the mind were combined allowing for a form of gymnastics that was more aesthetic and individual and which left behind the form that focused on strictness, discipline, the emphasis on defeating records, and focus on strength.

Don Francisco Amorós y Ondeano, was born on February 19, 1770, in Valencia and died on August 8, 1848, in Paris. He was a Spanish colonel, and the first person to introduce educative gymnastics in France. The German Friedrich Ludwig Jahn started the German gymnastics movement in 1811 which led to the invention of the parallel bars, rings, high bar, the pommel horse and the vault horse.

Germans Charles Beck and Charles Follen and American John Neal brought the first wave of gymnastics to the United States in the 1820s. Beck opened the first gymnasium in the US in 1825 at the Round Hill School in Northampton, Massachusetts. Follen opened the first college gymnasium and the first public gymnasium in the US in 1826 at Harvard College and in Boston, Massachusetts, respectively. Neal was the first American to open a public gymnasium in the US in Portland, Maine in 1827. He also documented and promoted these early efforts in the American Journal of Education and The Yankee, helping to establish the American branch of the movement.

The Federation of International Gymnastics (FIG) was founded in Liege in 1881. By the end of the nineteenth century, men's gymnastics competition was popular enough to be included in the first modern Olympic Games in 1896. From then on until the early 1950s, both national and international competitions involved a changing variety of exercises gathered under the rubric, gymnastics, that included, for example, synchronized team floor calisthenics, rope climbing, high jumping, running, and horizontal ladder. During the 1920s, women organized and participated in gymnastics events. The first women's Olympic competition was limited, only involving synchronized calisthenics and track and field. These games were held in 1928, in Amsterdam.
By 1954, Olympic Games apparatus and events for both men and women had been standardized in modern format, and uniform grading structures (including a point system from 1 to 15) had been agreed upon. In 1930, the first UK mass movement organisation of women in gymnastics, the Women's League of Health and Beauty, was founded by Mary Bagot Stack in London. At this time, Soviet gymnasts astounded the world with highly disciplined and difficult performances, setting a precedent that continues. Television has helped publicize and initiate a modern age of gymnastics. Both men's and women's gymnastics now attract considerable international interest, and excellent gymnasts can be found on every continent.

In 2006, a new points system for Artistic gymnastics was put into play. With an A Score (or D score) being the difficulty score, which as of 2009 is based on the top 8 high scoring elements in a routine (excluding Vault). The B Score (or E Score), is the score for execution and is given for how well the skills are performed.

FIG-recognized disciplines

The following disciplines are governed by FIG.

Artistic gymnastics

Artistic Gymnastics is usually divided into Men's and Women's Gymnastics. Men compete on six events: Floor Exercise, Pommel Horse, Still Rings, Vault, Parallel Bars, and Horizontal Bar, while women compete on four: Vault, Uneven Bars, Balance Beam, and Floor Exercise. In some countries, women at one time competed on the rings, high bar, and parallel bars (for example, in the 1950s in the USSR).

In 2006, FIG introduced a new point system for Artistic gymnastics in which scores are no longer limited to 10 points. The system is used in the US for elite level competition. Unlike the old code of points, there are two separate scores, an execution score and a difficulty score. In the previous system, the execution score was the only score. It was and still is out of 10.00, except for short exercises. During the gymnast's performance, the judges deduct this score only. A fall, on or off the event, is a 1.00 deduction, in elite level gymnastics. The introduction of the difficulty score is a significant change. The gymnast's difficulty score is based on what elements they perform and is subject to change if they do not perform or complete all the skills, or they do not connect a skill meant to be connected to another. Connection bonuses are where deviation happens most commonly between the intended and actual difficulty scores, as it can be difficult to connect multiple flight elements. It is very hard to connect skills if the first skill is not performed correctly. The new code of points allows the gymnasts to gain higher scores based on the difficulty of the skills they perform as well as their execution. There is no maximum score for difficulty, as it can keep increasing as the difficulty of the skills increase.

Competitive events for women in artistic gymnastics

Vault 

In the vaulting events, gymnasts sprint down a  runway, to take off  onto a vault board (or perform a roundoff or handspring entry onto a vault board),  to land momentarily inverted on the hands on the vaulting horse or vaulting table (pre-flight segment), then propel themselves forward or backward off that platform to a two-footed landing (post-flight segment). Every gymnast starts at a different point on the vault runway depending on their height and strength. The post-flight segment may include one or more multiple saltos, or twisting movements. A round-off entry vault, called a Yurchenko, is a commonly performed vault in the higher levels in gymnastics. When performing a Yurchenko, gymnasts round-off so their hands are on the runway while their feet land on the vault board. From the round-off position, the gymnast travels backward so that the hands land on the vaulting table. The gymnast then blocks off the vaulting platform into various twisting and/or somersaulting combinations. The post-flight segment brings the gymnast to her feet.  Less difficult vaults include taking off from the vault board with both feet at the same time and either doing a front handspring or round-off onto the vaulting table.

In 2001, the traditional vaulting horse was replaced with a new apparatus, sometimes known as a tongue, horse, or vaulting table. The new apparatus is more stable, wider, and longer than the older vaulting horse, approximately 1 m in length and 1 m in width, giving gymnasts a larger blocking surface. This apparatus is thus considered safer than the vaulting horse used in the past. With the addition of this new, safer vaulting table, gymnasts are attempting more difficult vaults.

Uneven bars 

On the uneven bars, the gymnast performs a timed routine on two parallel horizontal bars set at different heights. These bars are made of fiberglass covered in wood laminate, to prevent them from breaking. In the past, bars were made of wood, but the bars were prone to breaking, providing an incentive to switch to newer technologies. The width and height of the bars may be adjusted to the size needed by individual gymnasts. In the past, the uneven parallel bars were closer together. The bars have been moved increasingly further apart, allowing gymnasts to perform swinging, circling, transitional, and release moves that may pass over, under, and between the two bars. At the Elite level, movements must pass through the handstand. Gymnasts often mount the uneven bars using a springboard or a small mat. Gymnasts may use chalk (MgCO3) and grips (a leather strip with holes for fingers to protect hands and improve performance) when performing this event. The chalk helps take the moisture out of gymnasts' hands to decrease friction and prevent rips (tears to the skin of the hands); dowel grips help gymnasts grip the bar.

Balance beam 

The gymnast performs a choreographed routine of up to 90 seconds in length consisting of leaps, acrobatic skills, somersaults, turns and dance elements on a padded beam. This stationary object can also be adjusted, to be raised higher or lower. The gymnast begins the 70-90 seconds exercise by mounting the beam by either a vault or a jump. The event requires balance, flexibility, grace, poise, and strength.

Floor 

The event in gymnastics performed on the floor is called floor exercise. The English abbreviation for the event in gymnastics scoring is FX. In the past, the floor exercise event was executed on the bare floor or mats such as wrestling mats. The floor event now occurs on a carpeted 12m × 12m square, usually consisting of hard foam over a layer of plywood, which is supported by springs generally called a spring floor. This provides a firm surface that provides extra bounce or spring when compressed, allowing gymnasts to achieve greater height and a softer landing after the composed skill. Gymnasts perform a choreographed routine for up to 90 seconds in the floor exercise event. Depending on the level, the gymnast may choose their own routine; however some levels have compulsory routines, where default music must be played. Levels three to six the music is the same for each levels along with the skills within the routine. However, recently, the levels have switched. Now, levels 6–10 are optional levels and they get to have custom routines made. In the optional levels (levels six to ten) there are skill requirements for the routine but the athlete is able to pick her own music without any words. The routine should consist of tumbling passes, series of jumps, leaps, dance elements, acrobatic skills, and turns, or pivots, on one foot. A gymnast can perform up to four tumbling passes, each of which usually includes at least one flight element without hand support. Each level of gymnastics requires the athlete to perform a different number of tumbling passes. In level 7 in the United States, a gymnast is required to do 2–3, and in levels 8–10, at least 3–4 tumbling passes are required.

Scoring 
Scoring for both Junior Olympic and NCAA level gymnastics uses a 10.0 scale. Levels below Level 9 start from a 10.0 automatically if all requirements for an event are met. Levels 9 and 10, and NCAA gymnastics all start below a 10.0 and require gymnastics to acquire bonus points through connections and skills to increase their start value to a 10.0. During a routine, deductions will be made by the judges for flaws in the form of the technique of a skill. For example, steps on landings or flexed feet can range from .05-.1 off, depending on the severity of the mistake.

Competitive events for men in artistic gymnastics

Floor 

Male gymnasts also perform on a 12meter x 12meter spring floor. A series of tumbling passes are performed to demonstrate flexibility, strength, and balance. Strength skills include circles, scales, and press handstands. Men's floor routines usually have multiple passes that have to total between 60–70 seconds and are performed without music, unlike the women's event. Rules require that male gymnasts touch each corner of the floor at least once during their routine.

Pommel horse 

A typical pommel horse exercise involves both single leg and double leg work. Single leg skills are generally found in the form of scissors, an element often done on the pommels. Double leg work, however, is the main staple of this event. The gymnast swings both legs in a circular motion (clockwise or counterclockwise depending on preference) and performs such skills on all parts of the apparatus. To make the exercise more challenging, gymnasts will often include variations on a typical circling skill by turning (moores and spindles) or by straddling their legs (Flares). Routines end when the gymnast performs a dismount, either by swinging his body over the horse or landing after a handstand variation.

Still rings 

The rings are suspended on wire cable from a point 5.75 meters from the floor. The gymnasts must perform a routine demonstrating balance, strength, power, and dynamic motion while preventing the rings themselves from swinging. At least one static strength move is required, but some gymnasts may include two or three. A routine ends with a dismount.

Vault 

Gymnasts sprint down a runway, which is a maximum of 25 meters in length, before hurdling onto a springboard. The gymnast is allowed to choose where they start on the runway. The body position is maintained while punching (blocking using only a shoulder movement) the vaulting platform. The gymnast then rotates to a standing position. In advanced gymnastics, multiple twists and somersaults may be added before landing. Successful vaults depend on the speed of the run, the length of the hurdle, the power the gymnast generates from the legs and shoulder girdle, the kinesthetic awareness in the air, how well they stuck the landing, and the speed of rotation in the case of more difficult and complex vaults.

Parallel bars 

Men perform on two bars executing a series of swings, balances, and releases that require great strength and coordination. The width between the bars is adjustable depending upon the actual needs of the gymnasts and usually 2m high.

Horizontal bar 

A 2.8  cm thick steel or fiberglass bar raised 2.5 m above the landing area is all the gymnast has to hold onto as he performs giant swings or giants (forward or backward revolutions around the bar in the handstand position), release skills, twists, and changes of direction. By using all of the momentum from giants and then releasing at the proper point, enough height can be achieved for spectacular dismounts, such as a triple-back salto. Leather grips are usually used to help maintain a grip on the bar, and to prevent rips. For training this event, straps are often used to ensure that you dont fall off the bar when learning new skills.

As with women, male gymnasts are also judged on all of their events including their execution, degree of difficulty, and overall presentation skills.

Rhythmic gymnastics

According to FIG rules, only women compete in rhythmic gymnastics. This is a sport that combines elements of ballet, gymnastics, dance, and apparatus manipulation. The sport involves the performance of five separate routines with the use of five apparatus; ball, ribbon, hoop, clubs, rope—on a floor area, with a much greater emphasis on the aesthetic rather than the acrobatic. There are also group routines consisting of 5 gymnasts and 5 apparatuses of their choice. Rhythmic routines are scored out of a possible 30 points; the score for artistry (choreography and music) is averaged with the score for the difficulty of the moves and then added to the score for execution.

International competitions are split between Juniors, under sixteen by their year of birth; and Seniors, for women sixteen and over again by their year of birth. Gymnasts in Russia and Europe typically start training at a very young age and those at their peak are typically in their late teens (15–19) or early twenties. The largest events in the sport are the Olympic Games, World Championships, European Championships, World Cup and Grand-Prix Series. The first World Championships were held in 1963 with its first appearance at the Olympics in 1984.

Rhythmic gymnastics apparatus

 BallThe ball is made of either rubber or synthetic material (pliable plastic) provided it possesses the same elasticity as rubber. It is from 18 to 20  cm in diameter and must have a minimum weight of 400g. The ball can be of any color and should rest in the gymnast's hand, not the wrist. Fundamental elements of a ball routine include throwing, bouncing, and rolling. The gymnast must use both hands and work on the whole floor area while showing continuous flowing movement. The ball is to emphasize the gymnast's flowing lines and body difficulty.
 Hoop A hoop is an apparatus in rhythmic gymnastics and may be made of plastic or wood, provided that it retains its shape during the routine. The interior diameter is from 51 to 90  cm and the hoop must weigh a minimum of 300g. The hoop may be of natural color or be part of fully covered by one or several colors, and it may be covered with adhesive tape either of the same or different colors as the hoop. Fundamental requirements of a hoop routine include rotation around the hand or body and rolling, as well as swings, circles, throws, and passes through and over the hoop. The routines in hoop involve mastery in both apparatus handling and body difficulties like leaps, jumps, and pivots.
 Ribbon The ribbon is made of satin or another similar material cloth of any color and may be multi-colored as well as have designs on it. The ribbon itself must be at least 35g (1 oz), 4–6 cm (1.6–2.4") in width and for senior category a minimum length of 6m (20') (5m (16.25') for juniors). The ribbon must be in one piece. The end that is attached to the stick is doubled for a maximum length of 1m (3'). This is stitched down both sides. At the top, a very thin reinforcement or rows of machine stitching for a maximum length of 5  cm is authorized. This extremity may end in a strap, or have an eyelet (a small hole, edged with buttonhole stitch or a metal circle), to permit attaching the ribbon. The ribbon is fixed to the stick by means of a supple attachment such as thread, nylon cord, or a series of articulated rings. The attachment has a maximum length of 7 cm (2.8"), not counting the strap or metal ring at the end of the stick where it will be fastened. Compulsory elements for the ribbon include flicks, circles, snakes and spirals, and throws. It requires a high degree of co-ordination to form the spirals and circles as any knots which may accidentally form in the ribbon are penalised. During a ribbon routine, large, smooth and flowing movements are looked for.
 Clubs Multi-piece clubs are the most popular clubs. The club is built along an internal rod, providing a base on which a handle made of polyolefin plastic is wrapped, providing an airspace between it and the internal rod. This airspace provides flex, cushioning impact, making the club softer on the hands. Foam ends and knobs further cushion the club. Multi-piece clubs are made in both a thin European style or larger bodied American style and in various lengths, generally ranging from 19 to 21 inches (480 to 530 mm). The handles and bodies are typically wrapped with decorative plastics and tapes. The skills involved are apparatus mastery and body elements, Clubs are thrown from alternate hands; each passes underneath the other clubs and is caught in the opposite hand to the one from which it was thrown. At its simplest, each club rotates once per throw, the handle moving down and away from the throwing hand at first. However, double and triple spins are frequently performed, allowing the club to be thrown higher for more advanced patterns and to allow tricks such as 360s to be performed underneath.
 Rope This apparatus may be made of hemp or a synthetic material which retains the qualities of lightness and suppleness. Its length is in proportion to the size of the gymnast. The rope should, when held down by the feet, reach both of the gymnasts' armpits. One or two knots at each end are for keeping hold of the rope while doing the routine. At the ends (to the exclusion of all other parts of the rope) an anti-slip material, either coloured or neutral may cover a maximum of 10 cm (3.94 in). The rope must be coloured, either all or partially and may either be of a uniform diameter or be progressively thicker in the center provided that this thickening is of the same material as the rope. The fundamental requirements of a rope routine include leaps and skipping. Other elements include swings, throws, circles, rotations and figures of eight. In 2011, the FIG decided to remove the use of rope from the program of senior individual competitions. It is still used in junior competitions and occasionally on the program for senior group competitions (eg. 2017–2018).

Men's rhythmic gymnastics
Men's rhythmic gymnastics is related to both men's artistic gymnastics and wushu martial arts. It emerged in Japan from stick gymnastics. Stick gymnastics has been taught and performed for many years with the aim of improving physical strength and health. Male athletes are judged on some of the same physical abilities and skills as their female counterparts, such as hand/body-eye co-ordination, but tumbling, strength, power, and martial arts skills are the main focus, as opposed to flexibility and dance in women's rhythmic gymnastics. There are a growing number of participants, competing alone and on a team; it is most popular in Asia, especially in Japan where high school and university teams compete fiercely. , there were 1000 men's rhythmic gymnasts in Japan.

The technical rules for the Japanese version of men's rhythmic gymnastics came around the 1970s. For individuals, only four types of apparatus are used: the double rings, the stick, the rope, and the clubs. Groups do not use any apparatus. The Japanese version includes tumbling performed on a spring floor. Points are awarded based a 10-point scale that measures the level of difficulty of the tumbling and apparatus handling. On November 27–29, 2003, Japan hosted first edition of the Men's Rhythmic Gymnastics World Championship.

The events consist of:
Stick
Clubs
Rope
Double Rings
Group

Along with the Japanese version of Men's Rhythmic there is a Spanish version which uses the same format and rules as the FIG recognized form of Women's Rhythmic Gymnastics.

Trampolining

Trampolining
Trampolining and tumbling consists of four events, individual and synchronized trampoline, double mini trampoline, and tumbling (also known as power tumbling or rod floor). Since 2000, individual trampoline has been included in the Olympic Games. The first World Championships were held in 1964.

Individual trampoline
Individual routines in trampolining involve a build-up phase during which the gymnast jumps repeatedly to achieve height, followed by a sequence of ten bounces without pause during which the gymnast performs a sequence of aerial skills. Routines are marked out of a maximum score of 10 points. Additional points (with no maximum at the highest levels of competition) can be earned depending on the difficulty of the moves and the length of time taken to complete the ten skills which is an indication of the average height of the jumps. In high level competitions, there are two preliminary routines, one which has only two moves scored for difficulty and one where the athlete is free to perform any routine. This is followed by a final routine which is optional. Some competitions restart the score from zero for the finals, other add the final score to the preliminary results.

Synchronized trampoline
Synchronized trampoline is similar except that both competitors must perform the routine together and marks are awarded for synchronization as well as the form and difficulty of the moves.

Double-mini trampoline

Double mini trampoline involves a smaller trampoline with a run-up, two scoring moves are performed per routine. Moves cannot be repeated in the same order on the double-mini during a competition. Skills can be repeated if a skill is competed as a mounter in one routine and a dismount in another. The scores are marked in a similar manner to individual trampoline.

Tumbling

In Tumbling, athletes perform an explosive series of flips and twists down a sprung tumbling track. Scoring is similar to trampolining. Tumbling was originally contested as one of the events in Men's Artistic Gymnastics at the 1932 Summer Olympics, and in 1955 and 1959 at the Pan American Games. From 1974 to 1998 it was included as an event for both genders at the Acrobatic Gymnastics World Championships. The event has also been contested since 1976 at the Trampoline and Tumbling World Championships.

Tumbling is competed along a 25 metre sprung tack with a 10 metre run up. A tumbling pass or run is a combination of 8 skills, with an entry skill, normally a round-off, to whips and into an end skill. Usually the end skill is the hardest skill of the pass. At the highest level, gymnasts with perform transitions skills, these are skills which are not whips, instead they are double or triple somersaults normally competed at the end of the run, now competed in the middle of the run connected before and after by either a whip or a flick.

Competition is made up of a qualifying round and a finals round. There are two different types of competition in tumbling, individual and team. In the team event three gymnasts out of a team of four compete one run each, if one run fails the final member of the team is allowed to compete with the three highest scores being counted. In the individual event qualification, the competitor will compete two runs, one a straight pass (including double and triple somersaults) and a twisting pass (including full twisting whips and combination skills such as a full twisting double straight ’full in back’). In the final of the individual event, the competitor must compete two different runs which can be either twisting or straight but each run normally uses both types (using transition skills).

Acrobatic gymnastics

Acrobatic gymnastics (formerly Sport Acrobatics), often referred to as acro if involved with the sport, acrobatic sports or simply sports acro, is a group gymnastic discipline for both men and women. Acrobats in groups of two, three and four perform routines with the heads, hands and feet of their partners. They may, subject to regulations (e.g. no lyrics), pick their own music.

There are four international age categories: 11–16, 12–18, 13–19, and Senior (15+), which are used in the World Championships and many other events around the world, including the European Championships and the World Games.

All levels require a balance and dynamic routine; 12–18, 13–19, and Seniors are also required to perform a final (combined) routine.

Currently, acrobatic gymnastics score is marked out of 30.00 for juniors, and can be higher at Senior FIG level based on difficulty:
 Difficulty – An open score, which is the sum of the difficulty values of elements (valued from the tables of difficulties) successfully performed in an exercise, divided by 100. This score is unlimited in senior competitions. 
 Execution – Judges give a score out of 10.00 for technical performance (how well the skills are executed), which is then doubled to emphasize its importance.
 Artistic – Judges give a score out of 10.00 for artistry (the overall performance of the routine, namely choreography)

There are five competitive event categories:
 Women's Pairs
 Mixed Pairs
 Men's Pairs
 Women's Groups (3 Woman) 
 Men's Groups (4 Men)

The World Championships have been held since 1974.

Aerobic gymnastics

Aerobic gymnastics (formally Sport Aerobics) involves the performance of routines by individuals, pairs, trios, groups with 5 people, and aerobic dance and aerobic step(8 people). Strength, flexibility, and aerobic fitness rather than acrobatic or balance skills are emphasized. Routines are performed for all individuals on a 7x7m floor and also for 12–14 and 15–17 trios and mixed pairs. From 2009, all senior trios and mixed pairs were required to be on the larger floor (10x10m), all groups also perform on this floor. Routines generally last 60–90 seconds depending on age of participant and routine category. The World Championships have been held since 1995.

The events consist of:
Individual Women
Individual Men
Mixed Pairs
Trios
Groups
Dance
Step

Parkour

On January 28, 2018 Parkour, also known as freerunning, was given the go ahead to begin development as a FIG sport. The FIG is planning to run World Cup competitions from 2018 onwards and will hold the first Parkour World Championships in 2020.

The events consist of:
Speedrun
Freestyle

Other disciplines
The following disciplines are not currently recognized by the Fédération Internationale de Gymnastique.

Aesthetic group gymnastics

Aesthetic Group Gymnastics (AGG) was developed from the Finnish "naisvoimistelu". It differs from Rhythmic Gymnastics in that body movement is large and continuous and teams are larger. Athletes do not use apparatus in international AGG competitions compared to Rhythmic Gymnastics where ball, ribbon, hoop and clubs are used on the floor area. The sport requires physical qualities such as flexibility, balance, speed, strength, coordination and sense of rhythm where movements of the body are emphasized through the flow, expression and aesthetic appeal. A good performance is characterized by uniformity and simultaneity. The competition program consists of versatile and varied body movements, such as body waves, swings, balances, pivots, jumps and leaps, dance steps, and lifts. The International Federation of Aesthetic Group Gymnastics (IFAGG) was established in 2003. The first Aesthetic Group Gymnastics World Championships was held in 2000.

TeamGym

TeamGym is a form of competition created by the European Union of Gymnastics, named originally EuroTeam. The first official competition was held in Finland in 1996. TeamGym events consist of three sections: women, men and mixed teams. Athletes compete in three different disciplines: floor, tumbling and trampette. In common for the performance is effective teamwork, good technique in the elements and spectacular acrobatic skills. There is no World Championships however there has been a European Championships held since 2010.

Wheel gymnastics

Wheel gymnasts do exercises in a large wheel known as the Rhönrad, gymnastics wheel, gym wheel, or German wheel, in the beginning also known as ayro wheel, aero wheel, and Rhon rod.

There are four core categories of exercise: straight line, spiral, vault and cyr wheel. The first World Championships was held in 1995.

Mallakhamba

Mallakhamba (Marathi: मल्लखम्ब) is a traditional Indian sport in which a gymnast performs feats and poses in concert with a vertical wooden pole or rope. The word also refers to the pole used in the sport.

Mallakhamba derives from the terms malla which denotes a wrestler and khamba which means a pole. Mallakhamba can therefore be translated to English as "pole gymnastics". On April 9, 2013, the Indian state of Madhya Pradesh declared mallakhamba as the state sport. In February 2019 the first Mallahkhamb World Championship was held in Mumbai

Non-competitive gymnastics
General gymnastics also known as Gymnastics for All enables people of all ages and abilities to participate in performance groups of 6 to more than 150 athletes. They can perform synchronized, choreographed routines. Troupes may consist of both genders and are separated into age divisions. The largest general gymnastics exhibition is the quadrennial World Gymnaestrada which was first held in 1939. In 1984 Gymnastics for All was officially recognized first as a Sport Program by the FIG (International Gymnastic Federation), and subsequently by national gymnastic federations worldwide with participants that now number 30 million. Non-competitive gymnastics is considered useful for its health benefits.

Levels

In the US, gymnastics levels for women called the Junior Olympic (JO) Program begins at 1 and goes to 10. The two kinds of levels are Compulsory (levels 1-5) and Optional (levels 6-10). Each level (1-10) has its own set of unique rules that ascend in difficulty level to level. Elite can follow 10 and is generally considered Olympic level. Men's gymnastics or The Junior Olympic Program consists of ten levels of training or competition with multiple age groups at each level creating opportunities for athletes and coaches to participate and or compete.

Since 2015, Canada has adopted the women’s JO Program, with some modifications, for use in the Provinces and Territories.

Scoring (code of points)

An artistic gymnast's score comes from deductions taken from the start value of a routine's elements. The start value of a routine is based on the difficulty of the elements the gymnast attempts and whether or not the gymnast meets composition requirements. The composition requirements are different for each apparatus. This score is called the D score. Deductions in execution and artistry are taken from a maximum of 10.0. This score is called the E score. The final score is calculated by adding the D and E score.

The current method of scoring, by adding D and E score to give the final score has been in place since 2006. The current method is called "open-end" scoring because there is no theoretical cap (although there is practical cap) to the D-score and hence the total possible score for a routine.   Before 2006, a gymnast's final score is deducted from a possible maximum of 10 for a routine.

A Code of Points or guidelines of scoring a routine's difficulty and execution is slightly revised for each quadrennium, or period of four years culminating in the Olympics year.

Landing 
In a tumbling pass, dismount, or vault, landing is the final phase, following take-off and flight This is a critical skill in terms of execution in competition scores, general performance, and injury occurrence. Without the necessary magnitude of energy dissipation during impact, the risk of sustaining injuries during somersaulting increases. These injuries commonly occur at the lower extremities such as cartilage lesions, ligament tears, and bone bruises/fractures. To avoid such injuries, and to receive a high-performance score, proper technique must be used by the gymnast. "The subsequent ground contact or impact landing phase must be achieved using a safe, aesthetic, and well-executed double foot landing." A successful landing in gymnastics is classified as soft, meaning the knee and hip joints are at greater than 63 degrees of flexion.

A higher flight phase results in a higher vertical ground reaction force. Vertical ground reaction force (vGRF) represents an external force which the gymnasts have to overcome with their muscle force and affects the gymnasts' linear and angular momentum. Another important variable that affects linear and angular momentum is the time the landing takes. Gymnasts can decrease the impact force by increasing the time taken to perform the landing. Gymnasts can achieve this by increasing hip, knee and ankle amplitude.

Former apparatus and events

Rope climbing

Generally, competitors climbed either a 6m (6.1m = 20  ft in the US) or an 8m (7.6m = 25  ft in the US), 38  mm diameter (1.5-inch) natural fiber rope for speed, starting from a seated position on the floor and using only the hands and arms. Kicking the legs in a kind of "tride" was normally permitted. Many gymnasts can do this in the straddle or pike position, which eliminates the help generated from the legs though it can be done with legs as well.

Flying rings

Flying rings was an event similar to still rings, but with the performer executing a series of stunts while swinging. It was a gymnastic event sanctioned by both the NCAA and the AAU until the early 1960s.

Club swinging
Club swinging, a.k.a. Indian clubs, was an event in Men's Artistic Gymnastics sometime up until the 1950s. It was similar to the clubs in both Women's and Men's Rhythmic Gymnastics but much simpler with few throws allowed. It was practice. It was included in the 1904 and 1932 Summer Olympic Games.

Other (men's artistic)
Team horizontal bar and parallel bar in the 1896 Summer Olympics
Team free and Swedish system in the 1912 and 1920 Summer Olympics
Combined and triathlon in the 1904 Summer Olympics
Side horse vault in 1924 Summer Olympics
Tumbling in the 1932 Summer Olympics

Other (women's artistic)
Team exercise at the 1928, 1936, and 1948 Summer Olympics
Parallel bars at the 1938 World Championships
Team portable apparatus at the 1952 and 1956 Summer Olympics

Health and safety

Gymnastics is one of the most dangerous sports, with a very high injury rate seen in girls age 11 to 18. Some gymnastic movements which were allowed in past competitions are now banned for safety reasons.

Physical injuries
Compared to athletes who play other sports, gymnasts are at higher than average risk of overuse injuries and injuries caused by early sports specialization among children and young adults.  Gymnasts are at particular risk of foot and wrist injuries. Strength training can help prevent injuries.

Eating disorders and RED–S
In addition to physical injuries, engaging in competitive gymnastics has been linked to eating disorders which, if left unchecked, can result in the development of relative energy deficiency in sport (RED-S), formerly known as the "female athlete triad". RED-S is a syndrome of three interrelated conditions which cause long-standing illness in girls and women and can even cause death.

Abuse
There have also been recorded cases of emotional and sexual abuse.

Height concerns
Gymnasts tend to have short stature, but it is unlikely that the sport affects their growth.  Parents of gymnasts tend also to be shorter than average.

See also

 Acro dance
 Acrobatics
 Cheerleading
 Glossary of gymnastics terms
 Gymnasium (ancient Greece)
 International Gymnastics Hall of Fame
 List of gymnastics competitions
 List of gymnastics terms
 List of gymnasts
 Major achievements in gymnastics by nation
 Majorettes
 NCAA Men's Gymnastics championship (US)
 NCAA Women's Gymnastics championship (US)
 Turners
 Uniform (gymnastics)
 Wheel gymnastics
 World Gymnastics Championships

References

Citations

Sources

External links

 International Federation of Gymnastics (FIG) official website
 International Federation of Aesthetic Group Gymnastics official website
 USA Gymnastics, the governing body for gymnastics in the US
 British Gymnastics, the governing body for gymnastics in the UK
 Brazilian Gymnastics, the governing body for gymnastics in the Brazil

 
Summer Olympic sports
Individual sports
Sports rules and regulations
Acrobatic sports